Thachom Poyil Rajeevan (28 June 1959 – 2 November 2022) was an Indian novelist and poet originally from Palery who wrote in Malayalam and English languages.

Works
In Malayalam, Rajeevan published two novels (Paleri Manikyam: Oru Pathirakolapathakathinte Katha, and KTN Kottoor: Ezhuthum Jeevithavum); six poetry collections (Vathil, Rashtratamtram, Korithachanal, Vayalkkarayil Ippolillatha, Pranayasatakam, and Dheergakalam); a travelogue (Purappettu Poya Vakku); and an essay collection (Athe Akasam Athe Bhoomi.

Both of his novels in Malayalam were made into films.

Rajeevan wrote Paleri Manikyam first in English when residing in Iowa, United States, in 2009. He translated it into Malayalam after coming back to Kerala. However, the English version, titled Undying Echoes of Silence, only appeared in August 2013.

Rajeevan was awarded the Kerala Sahitya Akademi Award for his novel KTN Kottor: Ezhuthum Jeevithavum, in 2014.

In English, he published Undying Echoes of Silence and two poetry collections (Kannaki and He Who Was Gone Thus).

Rajeevan also edited an anthology of poems (Third Word: Post Socialist Poetry) with Croatian poet, Lana Derkac.

Reviews
Rajeevan received praise from Sashi Tharoor who wrote in The Hindu: "That the University of Calicut harbours such talent in its midst is itself a priceless public relations asset of which I hope the University's administrators are proud."

Regarding He Who Was Gone Thus, Anita Nair stated in the Hindu that it would dazzle even a reader who skims through it.

Awards and fellowships
Rajeevan received a Ledig House International Writers Residency in 2008. He was the second recipient from Kerala, and the eighth from India.

References 

1959 births
2022 deaths
People from Kozhikode district
Novelists from Kerala
Indian literary critics
English-language poets from India
Malayalam-language writers
Malayalam novelists
Malayalam poets
Malayalam literary critics
Indian male novelists
20th-century Indian novelists
20th-century Indian poets
Indian male poets
Poets from Kerala
20th-century Indian male writers